Claude Crétier (born 14 May 1977 in Bourg-Saint-Maurice) is a French former alpine skier who competed in the 2002 Winter Olympics.

References

External links
 sports-reference.com

1977 births
Living people
French male alpine skiers
Olympic alpine skiers of France
Alpine skiers at the 2002 Winter Olympics
People from Bourg-Saint-Maurice
Sportspeople from Savoie